The 1989 World Juniors Track Cycling Championships were the 15th annual Junior World Championships for track cycling held in Moscow, Soviet Union in August 1989.

The Championships had five events for men (Sprint, Points race, Individual pursuit, Team pursuit and 1 kilometre time trial) and three for women (Individual pursuit, Points race and Sprint).

Events

Medal table

References

UCI Juniors Track World Championships
1989 in track cycling
1989 in Soviet sport